Tobias Rehberger (born June 2, 1966) is a German sculptor, born in Esslingen am Neckar. He studied under Thomas Bayrle and Martin Kippenberger at the Stadelschule in Frankfurt am Main, where he now teaches.

Work 

Rehberger works in the wider sphere of design and architecture, and his art is difficult to categorize. He has created an idyllic Japanese garden in the middle of Manhattan; Pop-inspired wallpaper consisting of photographs of his organs; a series of Modernist-looking treehouses in a park in northern Germany; and an enormous tanker based on a crude boat that the father of a friend built to escape from Vietnam.

For his art-car series, a project that he began in 1999, Rehberger sent simple sketches, composed essentially from memory, of a Porsche 911 and a McLaren F1 to a manufacturer in Thailand. There were no measurements or schematics included. The only parameters were that the cars had to be driveable and built to human scale.

Rehberger also spent some time in Cameroon, where he provided native crafts workers with his crude drawings of well-known modernist chairs and asked them to recreate the designs. The results were filled with cultural misreadings: Alvar Aalto's classic three-legged stool, for instance, was given an extra leg for stability.

On the east side of Madison Square Park in New York, Rehberger in 2001 created Tsutsumu, an elegant Japanese garden made up of a large bonsai tree, a bench and a rock. Early in the morning, even on sweltering August days, the Public Art Fund sprayed the garden with four inches of man-made snow.

Rehberger received the Golden Lion award for best artist at the 2009 Venice Biennale. In December 2011, he unveiled his public sculpture Obstinate Lighthouse, commissioned by the City of Miami Beach. In 2012, he was commissioned to design a  project space in the Leeum, Samsung Museum of Art in Seoul, Korea. Rehberger designed an exclusive collection of purses and bags for the German fashion label MCM in 2016.

Tobias Rehberger is represented by neugerriemschneider in Berlin.

Exhibitions (selection) 

 Kunsthalle Basel 1998
 Moderna Museet, Stockholm, 1998
 Sprengel Museum, Hannover 1998
 Geläut – bis ich's hör ..., Museum für Neue Kunst, Karlsruhe, 2002
 Bitte ... danke, Galerie der Stadt Stuttgart, 2003/2004
 Private matters Whitechapel Gallery, London, 2004
 Cancelled projects, Museum Fridericianum, Cassel, 1995
 Home and away and outside installation, Schirn Kunsthalle, Frankfurt, 2014
 New York Bar Oppenheimer, Hotel Americano, New York, 2013
 Dazzle Ship London, HMS President, London, 2014

Recognition 
 Förderpreis des Internationalen Kunstpreises of Baden-Württemberg Landes, 1999
 Ten-Preis 2001
 Karl-Ströher-Preis 2003
 Golden Lion for Best Artist that responded to the 2009 theme "Fare Mondi // Making Worlds" Venice Biennale

Notes and references

External links 
 Webpage at Galerie Bärbel Grässlin

German sculptors
Städelschule alumni
German male sculptors
1966 births
Living people
German contemporary artists